"Won't Cry" is a pop song written by Vincent Fang, first sung by Jay Chou and Mayday vocalist, Ashin from his fifteenth studio album released in 15 July 2022, Greatest Works of Art.  It was released in September 2019 on QQ Music, Koowo Music, and Kugo Music under label JVR Music. 25 minutes after it was released, 2.29 millions of copies were sold. Less than two hours after its release, the total sales have exceeded 11 million RMB. It was also their first song since third years of Jay Chou's 14th studio album Bedtime Stories and Mayday's 9th studio album History of Tomorrow.

Promotion 
On September 10, 2019, Jay Chou uploaded a photo of Jiugongge on his personal social networking site to announce the new song title "Won't cry" and again announced that it would open a new song at 11:00 on the 16th. Jay Chou's text: "The first broadcast at 11:00 on the 16th, I can only say that if you don't catch the first broadcast, you will cry! Just like watching the game, others have told you who won the game... then you will say, 'Why don’t you tell me the first broadcast early', then I will say, I have already told you...”

Interpretation 
"Won't Cry" is a love song about "fulfill" and "promise". This beautiful love story was played slowly only with piano. The whole song is based on the piano, and the string is weaving a lyrical scene. The atmosphere of a love movie; the lyrics are the first person of the boy, and the mood transition and story line of this love; a few short lyrics that illustrates the love between men and women because they consider each other too much. The delicate thoughts express their enthusiasm, which makes them easy to resonate and bring in feelings; each love has its own grievances and helplessness. Even if it is going to break up, it is necessary to "won't cry " and smile.

Music video 
The music video is directed by director Muh Chen, describing the story of a pair of lovers falling in love in Tokyo. The director invited the Japanese actress Ayaka Miyoshi and Keisuke Watanabe to perform in this music video. Two of them played as a dream couple, the girl helped the actor who loves photography signed up for an international photography school. The actor had been accepted and had to go abroad for further study. The girl gave the boy the greatest gift. She bought the boy his favorite camera and sent him abroad. The boy left alone. Living in the same place, the final reversal of the story is heart-touching. The boy came back to the girl after he finished his study and it is happy ending.

Jay Chou and Ashin also performed in the MV. It was filmed in Tokyo at the top floor of a building. On that day, they came early in the morning before sunrise to prepare a line of the music video. The piano also took some time to get to the top floor.Tokyo is very hot in mid-August, but Jay Chou and Ashin  were trying so hard to finish the video even under the hot sun.The significant thing in this video is that both of them are very confidential for this collaboration, the shooting staffs of both sides and even the photographers do not know each other that they will do this video together until they start the real shooting. They did all this because they wanted to surprise their fans

Releases 
At 23:00 on September 16, 2019, Jay Chou's new song "Won't Cry" was officially launched. In half an hour, the total sales volume reached 2 million, because there were too many people listening online, QQ music, and other music platforms. It was amazing sales. On September 17, the song had achieved a total sales of 5.485 million. The total sales reached 16.456 million RMB, ranking seventh in the 2019 digital album sales list, and still in a state of rapid growth. 
"Won't Cry" on the line less than 12 hours, QQ music statistics sales have exceeded 15 million RMB, the song won the "gold diamond record" level certification, "Won't Cry" became the highest number of digital music sales history of the QQ music platform.  At the same time, it was also the first and fastest digital single of the QQ music platform.

Live performances 
This song used for the first time during Mayday's 2019 concert tour Just Rock it!!! - Blue at Hongkou Football Stadium, Shanghai on 25 October 2019 with Jay Chou as a special guest star. And the live music video was released through B'in Music channel on 25 January 2020.

Charts

References

2019 songs
2019 singles